Andre Agassi was the defending champion and won in the final 6–2, 6–4 against Jan-Michael Gambill.

Seeds

  Tommy Haas (first round)
  Andre Agassi (champion)
  Sébastien Grosjean (second round)
  Andy Roddick (semifinals)
  Gustavo Kuerten (quarterfinals)
  Sjeng Schalken (first round)
  Xavier Malisse (quarterfinals)
  Max Mirnyi (semifinals)

Draw

Finals

Top half

Bottom half

External links
 2002 Mercedes-Benz Cup draw

Los Angeles Open (tennis)
2002 ATP Tour